Kayraly is a rural locality (a Posyolok) in Kandalakshskiy District of Murmansk Oblast, Russia. The village is located beyond the Arctic circle.

References

Rural localities in Murmansk Oblast
Kandalakshsky District